Richard Matthew Johnson (born 1 September 1988) is an English former professional cricketer who played for Warwickshire and Derbyshire County Cricket Clubs. He played as a right-handed batsman and wicket-keeper.

Johnson was born in Solihull and educated at Solihull School. He played for ECB Schools against an India Under-19 team, before making his Minor Counties Championship debut for Herefordshire in the same year. In 2007 he began playing for Warwickshire Second XI and in May 2008 made his debut in List A cricket for the county before making first-class cricket debut for Warwickshire against Cambridge UCCE later the same month.

After two seasons with Derbyshire, Johnson retired from professional cricket in 2014. In December 2014 he returned to Warwickshire in the role of Assistant Strength and Conditioning Coach.

References

External links

1988 births
Living people
English cricketers
Warwickshire cricketers
Herefordshire cricketers
Derbyshire cricketers
Sportspeople from Solihull
English cricketers of the 21st century
Wicket-keepers